Marjorie Patterson (May 12, 1886 – March 11, 1948) was an American author and actress in the early 20th century.

Her works included the novels Fortunata (1911), The Dust of the Road (1913), about her experiences acting in London, and A Woman's Man (1919).

Publishers Weekly provided this summary of Fortunata in 1911: "Fortunata is the granddaughter of an old Roman Princess and lives in a great Roman palace. When about 18 she begins to have her own way. She spends money lavishly, associates with most unhealthy companions for a young girl. Finally she drifts to England and marries a very rich man and is forced to live with his hum-drum mother and daughters. The Italian wife remains erratic and the end is tragedy." H.L. Mencken gave the book a positive review.

Patterson's theatre roles included playing the title role in Pierrot the Prodigal (which played at the Booth Theatre in New York and was produced by Winthrop Ames and Walter Knight), and in the one-act Pan in Ambush, which she wrote. She also acted for a few years in England.

Reporting on her in the 1910s places her birth year around 1891; it was not uncommon at this time for actresses to claim a younger age. Attention to her doings dropped off by about 1922, and there is little subsequent mention of her after that time.

Patterson was the only daughter of Wilson Patterson and Margaret Sherwood. Her great-grandfather was author and critic John Neal, and her great-aunt was Elizabeth Patterson Bonaparte, sister-in-law of Napoleon. She lived her later years in New York City where she died of hepatitis.

Bibliography
 Fortunata: a novel (February 1911, Harper & Bros.)
 The Dust of the Road (1913)
 A Woman's Man (1919)
 Pan in Ambush (one act play)

References

External links
 

 Fortunata (Harper & Bros., 1911)
 The Dust of the Road (Henry Holt, 1913)
 A Woman's Man (1919)
 Pan in Ambush (play, published 1921)

1886 births
1948 deaths
20th-century American novelists
20th-century American women writers
American women novelists
Novelists from Maryland
Actresses from Baltimore
Patterson family of Maryland